The heptathlon at the 1991 World Championships in Athletics was held at the Olympic Stadium on August 26 and 27, 1991.

Medalists

Schedule

Monday, August 26, 1991

Tuesday, August 27, 1991

Records

Results

Overall results
Points table after 7th event

See also
 1988 Women's Olympic Heptathlon
 1990 Women's European Championships Heptathlon
 1991 Hypo-Meeting
 1992 Women's Olympic Heptathlon

References
 IAAF results: 100 m hurdles, high jump, shot put, 200 m, long jump, javelin, 800 m
IAAF results: Final standings

Heptathlon
Heptathlon at the World Athletics Championships
1991 in women's athletics